The men's long distance (10.1 kilometers) event at the 2011 Asian Winter Games was held on 3 February at the Almaty Biathlon and Cross-Country Ski Complex.

Schedule
All times are Almaty Time (UTC+06:00)

Results
Legend
DNF — Did not finish

References

External links
Official Website

Men's long distance